The Mississippi Valley League (MVL) was a baseball Class D level minor league that operated from 1922 through 1933. Playing its last year as a Class B level league, the league franchises were based in Iowa and Illinois. Like many leagues at the time, the Great Depression led to its demise. The Mississippi Valley League was founded by Michael H. Sexton, of Rock Island, Illinois, who was then president of the National Association of Professional Baseball Leagues.

History
The league began play in 1922 with six teams: the Cedar Rapids Bunnies, Marshalltown Ansons, Rock Island Islanders,  Waterloo Hawks, Ottumwa Cardinals and the Dubuque Climbers. There were no formal playoffs, and the Bunnies finished in first place. All teams from 1922 returned for 1923 with the Climbers finishing first in the league. Again, there were no formal playoffs.

In 1924, the league expanded to eight teams, adding the Moline Plowboys and Burlington Bees. The Dubuque Climbers became the Dubuque Dubs, though the other teams remained the same. The Hawks finished first in the league.

All teams from 1924 returned for 1925, with the Dubs becoming the Dubuque Ironmen. The Bunnies finished first in the league for the second time four years. In 1926, the Ottumwa Cardinals became the Ottumwa Packers and the Dubuque Dubs became the Dubuque Speasmen, named after their manager Bill Speas. The Packers finished in first place.

In 1927, the Speasmen returned to their former name the Dubuque Dubs. All other teams returned intact from the year before. Dubuque finished first in the league. The same teams played in 1928, with the Hawks finishing in first place.  1929 saw multiple league changes. The Dubs became the Dubuque Tigers. The Marshalltown Ansons and Ottumwa Packers left the league and were replaced by the Keokuk Indians and Davenport Blue Sox. The Tigers finished first in the league.

All teams from 1929 returned for 1930, with the Bunnies finishing in first place for the third time in league history. The teams remained intact for 1931 as well, with the Keokuk Indians finishing in first place. 1932 featured no new teams, though it did have a new feature - a playoff system. All teams returned from 1931, and the Blue Sox finishing in first place. They however lost in the league playoffs four games to two to the Islanders, so the Islanders were the league champions.

In 1933, the league featured only six teams for the first time since 1923. It also moved up in rank from Class-D to Class-B, and saw three new arrivals (Peoria Tractors, Quincy Indians, Springfield Senators) as well as multiple departures (Burlington Bees, Cedar Rapids Bunnies, Moline Plowboys, Waterloo Hawks, Dubuque Tigers). The Blue Sox finished in first place and defeated the Islanders four games to one in the playoffs to become league champions.

The 1933 Davenport Blue Sox are ranked #58 in the All-time Top 100 teams by MiLB.com. The Blue Sox finished the season 82-32, as Como Cotelle hit .407 and Ed Hall drove in 151 runs.

The Rock Island Islanders were the only team to play in the league through its entire 12-year existence.

Cities represented: 1922–1933
 
Burlington, IA: Burlington Bees (1924–1932) 
Cedar Rapids, IA: Cedar Rapids Bunnies (1922–1932)
Davenport, IA: Davenport Blue Sox (1929–1933)
Dubuque, IA: Dubuque Climbers (1922–1923); Dubuque Dubs (1924); Dubuque Ironmen (1925); Dubuque Speasmen (1926); Dubuque Dubs (1927–1928); Dubuque Tigers (1929–1932) 
Keokuk, IA: Keokuk Indians (1929–1933) 
Marshalltown, IA: Marshalltown Ansons (1922–1928) 
Moline, IL: Moline Plowboys (1924–1932) 
Ottumwa, IA: Ottumwa Cardinals (1922–1925); Ottumwa Packers (1926–1928) 
Peoria, IL: Peoria Tractors (1933)
Quincy, IL: Quincy Indians (1933)
Rock Island, IL: Rock Island Islanders (1922–1933)
Springfield, IL: Springfield Senators (1933) 
Waterloo, IA: Waterloo Hawks (1922–1932)

Mississippi Valley League standings and statistics

1922 to 1927
1922 Mississippi Valley League
schedule

 
1923 Mississippi Valley League
schedule
 Playoffs: None Scheduled. 
 
1924 Mississippi Valley League
schedule
 Playoffs: None Scheduled. 

1925 Mississippi Valley League
schedule
 Playoffs: None Scheduled. 

1926 Mississippi Valley League
schedule
 Playoffs: None Scheduled. 

1927 Mississippi Valley League
schedule
 Playoffs: None Scheduled.

1928 to 1933
1928 Mississippi Valley League
schedule
Playoffs: None Scheduled.

 
1929 Mississippi Valley League
schedule
 Playoffs: None Scheduled.  

1930 Mississippi Valley League
schedule
 Playoffs: None Scheduled. 

1931 Mississippi Valley League
schedule
 Playoffs: None Scheduled 

1932 Mississippi Valley League
schedule
 Playoffs: Rock Island 4 games, Davenport 2.

1933 Mississippi Valley League
schedule
 Playoffs: Davenport 4 games, Rock Island 1

References

Defunct minor baseball leagues in the United States
Baseball leagues in Illinois
Baseball leagues in Iowa
Sports leagues established in 1922
Sports leagues disestablished in 1933